= Rosetta Salomon Swaab =

Dutch circus performer

Rosetta Salomon Swaab (1759–1825), was a Dutch circus performer and circus owner.

She was married to the tightrope walker and equestrian Lion Kinsbergen (1750–1813) and performed by his side. She was a famous artist in the Netherlands of her time, performing as a tightrope walker and as an acrobat on horses. She and her spouse toured with their own circus company nationwide with a base in Amsterdam. After the death of her spouse in 1813, she took over the circus as owner and manager.
